State Route 9A (SR 9A) is a numbered state highway in Maine, which serves as an alternate to SR 9. It starts from SR 9 in Wells and returns to SR 9 in Kennebunk.

Route description 
SR 9A begins at a split with SR 9 in Wells, curving to the northeast and immediately crossing Route 109. SR 9A proceeds northeast, paralleling Interstate 95 (Maine Turnpike), as well as U.S. Route 1 (US 1) and SR 9 which lay to its east. SR 9A turns to the east and enters the town of Kennebunk, passing under the Turnpike without an interchange. SR 9A meets the eastern end of SR 99 and then promptly intersects US 1, with which it forms a brief concurrency. US 1 and SR 9A intersect with SR 35 downtown, at which point SR 9A turns southeast, leaving US 1 to join SR 35.

Junction list

References

External links 

Maine State Route Log via floodgap.com

009A
Transportation in York County, Maine